Molesworth is a small community in the town of Huron East, in Southwestern Ontario, Canada. Molesworth was founded in 1852 by John Mitchell and his family, who operated a general store that served the influx of settlers to the area. Mitchell also acted as a justice of the peace.

Transportation
Molesworth is at the junction of County Road 86 and County Road 19.

It is served by a scheduled bus service to Wingham and Stratford. and is near Listowel.

References
 Link to Molesworth history page

Communities in Huron County, Ontario